Brett derives from a Middle English surname meaning "Briton" or "Breton", referring to the Celtic people of Britain and Brittany, France. Brette can be a feminine name.

People with the surname
 Adrian Brett (born 1945) English flutist and writer
 Agnes Baldwin Brett (1876–1955), American numismatist
 Bill Brett, Baron Brett (born 1942), English politician and businessman
 Bob Brett (1953−2021), Australian tennis coach
 Brian Brett (speedway rider) (1938-2006), English speedway rider
 Brian Brett (born 1950), Canadian writer
 Charles Brett (1928–2005), Northern Irish lawyer
 Charles Brett (MP) (1715–1799), British politician
 Dorothy Brett (1883–1977), British-American painter
 George Brett (baseball) (born 1953), American baseball player, brother of Ken Brett
 George Brett (general) (1886–1963), American general
 George Wendell Brett (1912–2005), American philatelist
 Henry Brett (polo player) (born 1974), English polo player
 Jan Brett (born 1949), American children's writer
 James Seymour Brett (born 1974) English film composer
 Jasper Brett (1895–1917), Irish rugby player
 Jeremy Brett (1933–1995), British actor
 Jodie Brett (born 1996), English footballer
 John Brett (disambiguation)
 Ken Brett (1948–2003), American baseball player
 Laurie Brett (born 1970), British actress
 Nick Brett (born 1974), English bowler 
 Paul Brett (born 1947), British guitarist
 Peter V. Brett (born 1973), American writer of fantasy novels
 Philip Brett (1937–2002), American musicologist and conductor
 Philip Milledoler Brett (1871–1960), American lawyer and university president
 Raymond L. Brett (1917–1996), professor of English and a friend of Philip Larkin
 Reginald Brett, 2nd Viscount Esher (1852–1930), British politician
 Richard Brett (1567–1637), English scholar
 Robert Brett (1851–1929), Canadian politician
 Rosa Brett (1829–1882), British painter 
 Ryan Brett (born 1991), baseball player
 Sammy Brett (1879–1939), English footballer
 Sarah Brett (born 1974), UK-based radio presenter
 Simon Brett (born 1945), British writer
 Stephen Brett (born 1985), New Zealand rugby player
 Sylvia Brett (1885–1971), Ranee of Sarawak
 Thomas Brett (cricketer)uo (1747–1809), English cricketer
 Thomas Brett (nonjuror) (1667–1743), English nonjuring clergyman
 Thomas Rutherford Brett (1931–2021), United States federal judge
 Tom Brett (born 1989), English cricketer
 William Brett, 1st Viscount Esher (1817–1899), British lawyer
 William Howard Brett (1846–1918), librarian
 William Howard Brett Jr. (1893–1989), Director of the United States Mint from 1954 to 1961

People with the given name

Brett Anderson (born 1967), English singer-songwriter
Brett Elizabeth Anderson (female, born 1979), American singer
Brett Barnett (born 1992), English writer and director
Brett Blundy (born 1959/1960), Australian billionaire businessman
Brett Boyko (born 1992), American football player
Brett Butler (baseball) (born 1957), American baseball player
Brett Butler (comedian) (born 1958), American comedian and actress
Brett Dalton (born 1983), American actor
Brett de Geus (born 1997), American baseball player
Brett Eldredge (born 1986), American country musician
Brett Favre (born 1969), American football player
Brett Gardner (born 1983), American baseball player
Brett Giehl aka Dalton Castle (wrestler)
Brett J. Gladman (born 1966), Canadian astronomer
Brett Goldstein (born 1980), British actor, writer and comedian
Brett Hull (born 1964), Canadian–American hockey player
Brett Hundley (born 1993), American football player
Brett James (born 1968), American singer, songwriter, and record producer
Brett Kavanaugh (born 1965), American Supreme Court Associate Justice
Brett Lauther (born 1990), Canadian football player
Brett Lee (born 1976), Australian cricketer
Brett Levis (born 1993), Canadian soccer player
Brett Maher (American football) (born 1989), American football punter and placekicker
Brett Maher (basketball) (born 1973), retired Australian basketball player
Brett Moffitt (born 1992), American NASCAR driver
Brett Morris (born 1986), Australian rugby league player
Brett Queener (born 1984), American lacrosse goaltender
Brett Ratner, US film director and actor
Brett Rice (born 1954), American actor
Brett Rypien (born 1996), American football player
Brett Salisbury (born 1968), American football player and writer
Brett Sheehy (born 1958), Australian artistic director
Brett Somers (1924–2007), Canadian-born American comedian and actress
Brett Sterling (born 1984), American NHL ice hockey player
Brett Stewart (director), American choir director
Brett Stewart (rugby league) (born 1985), Australian Rugby League player
Brett Toth (born 1996), American football player
Brett Vroman (born 1955), American basketball player
Brett Wheeler (born 1971), Australian basketball player
Brett Whiteley (1939–1992), Australian artist
Brett Yang (born 1992), Australian violinist and Youtuber
Brett Young (born 1981), American country singer

Fictional characters
Brett Ashley, a character in the Ernest Hemingway novel The Sun Also Rises
Lord Brett Sinclair, a character in the 1971 TV series The Persuaders!
Brett Graham, a character in the 1986 film Maximum Overdrive
Sergeant Brett Shelton, a character in the 1991 film Child's Play 3
Jezaille Brett, a character in the video game The Great Ace Attorney: Adventures
Brett Bunsen, a character in the 2009 animated series Archer
Brett Hull, a character in the 2009 series Parks and Recreation
Brett Kobashigawa, a character in the 2015 series Superstore
Brett Hand, a character in the 2021 series Inside Job

See also
 Bret (disambiguation)
 Bret (given name)
 Bret (surname)
Brett, family name of Viscount Esher

References

English given names
Masculine given names
Feminine given names
Unisex given names
English-language masculine given names
English-language feminine given names
English-language unisex given names
English-language surnames